Fritz Saladin (16 November 1909 – 2 November 1998) was a Swiss racing cyclist. He rode in the 1937 Tour de France.

References

1909 births
1998 deaths
Swiss male cyclists
Place of birth missing